Ali Nozar Karimi (born 11 February 1994) is an Iranian professional footballer who plays for Kayserispor as a central midfielder.

Club career

Sepahan
He joined Sepahan in the summer of 2012. From 2010 to 2012, he was a member of Sepahan under-19 football team. Karimi made his first league appearance in the 2013–14 season. He won the Persian Gulf Pro League with Sepahan in the 2014–15 season.

Dinamo Zagreb

2016–17
On 1 July 2016, Karimi joined Croatian champions Dinamo Zagreb on a five-year contract for a reported US$400,000 transfer fee. He is the first Iranian to play in Croatian Prva HNL. Karimi made his pre–season debut on 2 July 2016, coming on as a second-half substitute against Romanian club CS Pandurii Târgu Jiu.

Karimi made his league debut on 13 August 2016, coming on as second-half substitute in a 2–1 victory against Inter Zapresic. He made his second appearance with the first team on 25 October 2016 in a 2–1 victory against Bjelovar in the Croatian Cup.

After only making one league appearance for Dinamo, in January 2017 Karimi joined Lokomotiva on a six-month loan deal.

Loan to Lokomotiva
Karimi joined Dinamo Zagreb's feeder club Lokomotiva in January 2017 on a 6-month loan. He finally got a chance to show off his power and control in the midfield as he started 6 games for Lokomotiva, set up multiple goals and scored his first goal in the Croatian league for the NK Lokomotiva on 26 April 2017 in a 1–0 league victory against Istra 1961.

Esteghlal
On 15 July 2018, Karimi joined Esteghlal signing a one-year contract with the club.

Qatar SC
On 1 November 2020, Karimi joined Qatar SC signing a one-year contract with the club.

Kayserispor 
In July 2020, Karimi joined Kayseispor as a free agent.

International career

Youth
He was invited to Iran U-23 training camp by Nelo Vingada in preparation for Incheon 2014 and 2016 AFC U-22 Championship (Summer Olympic qualification). He was named for the Iran U23 and on the final roster for Incheon 2014.

Senior
Karimi was called up to the national team in March 2014, but did not play a game. He was called up again to the senior Iran squad for a 2018 FIFA World Cup qualifier against India in September 2015. He made his debut against Papua New Guinea on 10 November 2016 in a friendly match.

In May 2018, he was named in Iran's preliminary squad for the 2018 World Cup in Russia. but did not make the final 23 because of injury.

Career statistics

Club

International

Honours
Sepahan
Hazfi Cup: 2012–13
Persian Gulf Pro League: 2014–15

Iran U23
 WAFF U23 Championship: 2015

References

External links
 Ali Karimi joined Al-Duhail

1994 births
Living people
People from Izeh
Iranian footballers
Iranian expatriate footballers
Iranian expatriate sportspeople in Croatia
Expatriate footballers in Croatia
Iranian expatriate sportspeople in Qatar
Expatriate footballers in Qatar
Sepahan S.C. footballers
GNK Dinamo Zagreb players
NK Lokomotiva Zagreb players
Esteghlal F.C. players
Qatar SC players
Al-Duhail SC players
Kayserispor footballers
Persian Gulf Pro League players
Croatian Football League players
First Football League (Croatia) players
Qatar Stars League players
Süper Lig players
Iran under-20 international footballers
Association football midfielders
Footballers at the 2014 Asian Games
Asian Games competitors for Iran
Iran international footballers
Sportspeople from Khuzestan province
2022 FIFA World Cup players